Route 347 is a provincial highway located in the Lanaudière region of Quebec. The 97-kilometer highway runs from Sainte-Geneviève-de-Berthier at the junction of Route 158 north of Autoroute 40 and ends in Notre-Dame-de-la-Merci at the junction of Route 125. In Saint-Gabriel-de-Brandon, it overlaps Route 348 while between north of Saint-Jean-de-Matha and Saint-Émélie-de-L'Énergie it overlaps Route 131.

Municipalities along Route 347
 Sainte-Geneviève-de-Berthier
 Saint-Norbert
 Saint-Gabriel-de-Brandon
 Saint-Gabriel
 Saint-Damien
 Saint-Émélie-de-L'Énergie
 Saint-Côme
 Notre-Dame-de-la-Merci

See also
 List of Quebec provincial highways

References

External links
 Transports Quebec Official Map 
 Route 347 on Google Maps

347
Roads in Lanaudière